Vidyadhar Bhattacharya (1693-1751) was the chief architect and city planner of Jaipur, Rajasthan. He hailed from Naihati of present-day West Bengal, and was already working in the Amer state as Junior Auditor when approached by Maharaja Sawai Jai Singh II in 1727 to build one of the earliest planned cities of India. City Palace, a newer addition to palace complex, was designed by Sir Samuel Swinton Jacob. He used principles of Shilpa Shastra and Vaastu Shastra to create a grid-based model of city.

Vidyadhar Garden 
The Vidyadhar Garden, located at Ghat ki Guni, near Galtaji, was built in memory of Purohit Vidyadhar Bhattacharya. Built in 1988, the garden was designed based on "Shilpa Shastra", the ancient book on Indian architecture that Vidyadhar Bhattacharya referred to while designing the pink city of Jaipur. Before the garden was built, the area, situated close to the Sisodia Garden, was believed to be a vineyard. 

The garden, nestled in the lap of a valley in Jaipur, has crystal waters, tranquil lakes, flower beds and well maintained gardens. It offers a panoramic view of the city. The garden is the perfect combination of contemporary Hindu and Mughal styles with its beautiful sylvan lakes, terraced lawns, fountains and the majestic pavilions with lord Krishna's murals and paintings. The place is managed by the government of Rajasthan and was used to host private get-togethers, but now it is banned by the government of Rajasthan.

References 

People from North 24 Parganas district
Bengali male artists
People from Jaipur
18th-century Indian architects
Artists from Rajasthan
1693 births
1751 deaths